San Francisco de Dos Ríos is the sixth district of the San José canton, in the San José province of Costa Rica. It is one of the administrative units surrounding San José downtown (officially composed by the districts of El Carmen, Merced, Hospital and Catedral). The district is primarily residential and industrial. It's also famous for the numerous motels between its boundaries.

Geography 
San Francisco de Dos Ríos has an area of  km² and an elevation of  metres.

It lies on the south-east of the canton, between Curridabat and Desamparados cantons (bordering them to the east and to the south respectively) and between the districts of San Sebastián and Zapote (bordering them also to the west and to the north respectively).

Locations
San Francisco de Dos Ríos district includes the "barrios" (or neighbourhoods) of Ahogados (part of it), Camelias, Cinco Esquinas, Coopeguaria, El Bosque, El Faro, Fátima, Hispano, San Marino Sur, I Griega, La Cabaña, Lincoln, Lomas de San Francisco, Maalot, Méndez, Pacífica, San Francisco de Dos Ríos (center), Sauces, Saucitos and Zurquí.

Demographics 

For the 2011 census, San Francisco de Dos Ríos had a population of  inhabitants.

Transportation

Road transportation 
The district is covered by the following road routes:
 National Route 39
 National Route 204
 National Route 207
 National Route 209
 National Route 211

External links
Municipalidad de San José. Distrito San Francisco de Dos Ríos – Website of San Jose Mayor, includes a map of the district and related info.

References 

Districts of San José Province
Populated places in San José Province